Radical 175 or radical wrong meaning "" is one of the 9 Kangxi radicals (214 radicals in total) composed of 8 strokes.

In the Kangxi Dictionary, there are 25 characters (out of 49,030) to be found under this radical.

 is also the 171st indexing component in the Table of Indexing Chinese Character Components predominantly adopted by Simplified Chinese dictionaries published in mainland China.

Evolution

Derived characters

Variant forms
This radical character is written differently in Simplified Chinese compared with other languages. In mainland China's writing reform, xin zixing, or the new printing typeface, adopted a more vulgar and symmetric form . This change may also be applied to Traditional Chinese publications in mainland China.

Literature

External links

Unihan Database - U+975E

175
171